Hardu Toru, commonly known as Toor, is a village in Anantnag tehsils in Anantnag district, Jammu and Kashmir, India. Hardu Toru village is located in Anantnag Tehsil of Anantnag district in Jammu & Kashmir. It is situated 17 km away from Anantnag.

Demographics
According to the 2011 Census of India, Hardu Toru village has a total population of 3,398 people including 1,696 males and 1,702 females; and has a literacy rate of 61.57%.

References 

Villages in Anantnag district